Folinella excavata is a species of sea snail, a marine gastropod mollusk in the family Pyramidellidae, the pyrams and their allies.

Description
The white shell is solid, opaque and rather glossy. Its length measures 3.75 mm. The teleoconch contains six whorls. The suture is broad and very deep.  The shell shows prominent spiral ridges, of which there are three on the main part of the body whorl, and two slighter ones at the base, and two ridges on the spire whorls. They are crossed obliquely by sharp longitudinal ribs, extending to the base. Their intersections with the spiral sculpture appear nodulous. The columellar tooth is small and remote. The umbilicus is narrow but distinct.

Distribution
This marine species occurs in the following locations:
 European waters (ERMS scope)
 Greek Exclusive Economic Zone
 Irish Exclusive economic Zone
 Portuguese Exclusive Economic Zone
 South West Coast of Apulia
 Spanish Exclusive Economic Zone
 United Kingdom Exclusive Economic Zone

References

 Terlizzi, A.; Scuderi, D.; Fraschetti, S.; Anderson, M.J. (2005). "Quantifying effects of pollution on biodiversity: a case study of highly diverse molluscan assemblages in the Mediterranean". Mar. Biol. 148(2): 293-305

External links
 To Biodiversity Heritage Library (1 publication)
 To CLEMAM
 To Encyclopedia of Life
 To World Register of Marine Species
 

Pyramidellidae
Gastropods described in 1836